Thom H. Dunning Jr. is an American chemist currently Distinguished Professor Emeritus at University of Illinois.

References

Year of birth missing (living people)
Living people
University of Illinois faculty
American chemists
California Institute of Technology alumni
Place of birth missing (living people)
Missouri University of Science and Technology alumni